Crash Nunatak is an isolated nunatak between Beta Peak and Mount Bowen in the Prince Albert Mountains, Victoria Land. It was named by the Southern Party of the New Zealand Geological Survey Antarctic Expedition, 1962–63, because the nunatak lies close to the scene of the U.S. Navy R4D plane crash of November 25, 1962.

References
 

Nunataks of Victoria Land
Scott Coast